Multipole magnets are magnets built from multiple individual magnets, typically used to control beams of charged particles. Each type of magnet serves a particular purpose.

 Dipole magnets are used to bend the trajectory of particles
 Quadrupole magnets are used to focus particle beams
 Sextupole magnets are used to correct for chromaticity introduced by quadrupole magnets

Magnetic field equations

The magnetic field of an ideal multipole magnet in an accelerator is typically modeled as having no (or a constant) component parallel to the nominal beam direction ( direction)
and the transverse components can be written as complex numbers:

Fields with a real  are called 'normal' while fields with  purely imaginary are called 'skewed'.

Stored energy equation

For an electromagnet with a cylindrical bore, producing a pure multipole field of order , the stored magnetic energy is:

Formulating the energy in terms of  can be useful, since the magnitude of the field and the bore radius do not need to be measured. 

Note that for a non-electromagnet, this equation still holds if the magnetic excitation can be expressed in Amperes.

Derivation 
The equation for stored energy in an arbitrary magnetic field is:

Now for an electromagnet with a cylindrical bore of radius , producing a pure multipole field of order , this integral becomes:

Ampere's Law for multipole electromagnets gives the field within the bore as:

Here,  is the radial coordinate. It can be seen that along  the field of a dipole is constant, the field of a quadrupole magnet is linearly increasing (i.e. has a constant gradient), and the field of a sextupole magnet is parabolically increasing (i.e. has a constant second derivative). Substituting this equation into the previous equation for  gives:

References

Types of magnets
Accelerator physics